Gall is a surname. Notable people with the name include:

 Gall (Native American leader) (c. 1840 – 1894), Hunkpapa Lakota war leader
 Saint Gall (c. 550 – c. 646), Irish disciple
 Albert Gall (1842–1905), American businessman and politician
 Benny Gall (born 1971), Danish football goalkeeper
 Boris Gáll (born 1994), Slovak football midfielder
 Bruce Gall, New Zealand rugby league player
 Carlotta Gall, British journalist and author
 Chris Gall,(born 1994), American progressive fusion Drummer
 David A. Gall (1941–2021), American jockey
 David Gall (printer) (1825–1887) South Australian printer and activist
 Endre Gáll (1868–1935), Hungarian jurist
 Ernest Gall (1863–1925), photographer in Adelaide, South Australia
 France Gall (1947–2018), French singer
 Franz Gall (disambiguation), multiple people
 Greg Gall (born 1965), American death metal drummer
 Hugh Gall ( 1888–1938), Canadian football player
 James Gall (1808–1895), Scottish clergyman
 John Gall (disambiguation), multiple people
 Joseph G. Gall (born 1928), American cell biologist
 Karl Gall (1903–1939), Austrian motorcycle racer
 Kevin Gall (born 1982), Welsh footballer
 Ludovic Gall (1900–1944), Romanian long-distance runner
 Mickey Gall (born 1992), American mixed martial arts fighter
 Robert Gall (1918–1990), French lyricist
 Romain Gall (born 1995), French-born American soccer player
 Ruth Gall (1923–2017), Australian chemist
 Sandy Gall (born 1927), British journalist and newscaster
 Yvonne Gall (1885–1972), French operatic soprano 
 Zlatko Gall (born 1954), Croatian journalist

See also
 Le Gall, surname

Ethnonymic surnames